The list of shipwrecks in 1896 includes ships sunk, foundered, grounded, or otherwise lost during 1896.

January

1 January

3 January

4 January

5 January

6 January

8 January

10 January

12 January

13 January

15 January

16 January

24 January

26 January

February

1 February

5 February

6 February

7 February

8 February

9 February

10 February

11 February

14 February

15 February

18 February

20 February

21 February

22 February

24 February

25 February

27 February

28 February

29 February

March

2 March

4 March

5 March

6 March

7 March

9 March

11 March

13 March

16 March

18 March

25 March

26 March

27 March

28 March

30 March

April

5 April

10 April

11 April

12 April

17 April

18 April

20 April

22 April

25 April

26 April

28 April

29 April

May

2 May

3 May

5 May

6 May

7 May

10 May

11 May

17 May

18 May

20 May

21 May

22 May

24 May

26 May

27 May

28 May

30 May

31 May

June

5 June

11 June

12 June

16 June

19 June

21 June

23 June

26 June

Unknown date

July

1 July

7 July

10 July

12 July

13 July

14 July

17 July

19 July

20 July

22 July

23 July

24 July

25 July

28 July

29 July

30 July

August

1 August

5 August

8 August

9 August

11 August

14 August

18 August

21 August

23 August

27 August

30 August

31 August

September

3 September

6 September

9 September

10 September

12 September

14 September

15 September

17 September

18 September

20 September

22 September

24 September

26 September

27 September

28 September

29 September

30 September

Unknown date

October

1 October

5 October

6 October

8 October

9 October

10 October

11 October

14 October

16 October

17 October

19 October

20 October

22 October

23 October

25 October

26 October

29 October

30 October

31 October

Unknown date

November

2 November

3 November

7 November

8 November

9 November

12 November

16 November

17 November

19 November

21 November

22 November

25 November

27 November

28 November

Unknown date

December

3 December

5 December

8 December

11 December

13 December

20 December

22 December

23 December

26 December

28 December

31 December

Unknown date

Unknown date

References

See also

1896